Lui is a surname in various cultures. It may be a variant spelling of two Chinese surnames ( Léi and  Lǚ), as well as an Italian surname. The surname Lui can also be found on various Pacific Islands.

Origins 
Lui may be the spelling of various Chinese surnames, based on their pronunciation in different varieties of Chinese; they are listed below by their spelling in Hanyu Pinyin, which reflects the Mandarin Chinese pronunciation:
 Léi, meaning "thunder"; the spelling Lui is based on the Cantonese pronunciation. The spelling Lui is common in Hong Kong, while other spellings of the same surname such as Loi and Louie are found in Macau and among overseas Chinese.
 Lǚ; nearly-homophonous with the above in Cantonese (note the differing tone), and so also spelled Lui, Loi, or Louie.

Lui is also an Italian surname, derived from the name of the month of July in the Eastern Lombard dialect spoken in Mantua and surroundings (compare Italian ).

Statistics 
In Italy, 287 families bore the surname Lui, with 200 (69.7%) located in Lombardy.

According to statistics cited by Patrick Hanks, there were 488 people on the island of Great Britain and 18 on the island of Ireland with the surname Lui as of 2011. There were no people with the surname on the island of Great Britain in 1881.

The 2010 United States Census found 6,156 people with the surname Lui, making it the 5,641st-most-common name in the country. This represented an increase from 5,620 (5,662nd-most-common) in the 2000 Census. In both censuses, about nine-tenths of the bearers of the surname identified as Asian, and roughly five per cent as White. It was the 216th-most-common surname among respondents to the 2000 Census who identified as Asian.

People

Chinese surname Léi 
 David Y.H. Lui (1944–2011), Canadian arts producer of Chinese descent
 Simon Lui (born 1964), Hong Kong actor
 Mark Lui (born 1969), Hong Kong Cantopop lyricist
 Elaine Lui (born 1973), Canadian television journalist
 Simon Lui (professor) (born 1981), Hong Kong-born Singaporean computer music researcher
 Lui Man Tik (born 1994), Hong Kong football left back
 Lui Kit Ming (born 2000), Hong Kong football midfielder
 Lui Kim-man, Hong Kong financial and technical writer

Chinese surname Lǚ 
 Lui Shou-Kwan (1919–1975), Hong Kong painter
 Lui Lok (1920–2010), Hong Kong police officer pursued by the Independent Commission Against Corruption
 Lui Che-woo (born 1929), Guangdong-born Hong Kong member of the Standing Committee of the Chinese People's Political Consultative Conference
 Lui Tsun-Yuen (1931–2008), Chinese classical musician and composer
 Lui Ming-wah (born 1939), Shandong-born Hong Kong Legislative Council member
 Ray Lui (born 1956), Vietnam-born Hong Kong actor
 Lui Tuck Yew (born 1961), Singaporean politician and diplomat
 Danny Lui (1957–2012), Hong Kong entrepreneur and venture capitalist
 Lui Kam Chi (born 1973), Hong Kong rower
 Yvonne Lui (born 1977), Hong Kong philanthropist
 Koni Lui (born 1982), Hong Kong beauty pageant titleholder
 Lui Chi Hing (born 1984), Hong Kong football coach
 Barton Lui Pan-To (born 1993), Hong Kong short track speed skater
 Lui Lai Yiu (born 1994), Hong Kong hurdler
 Edan Lui (born 1997), Hong Kong singer
 John C.S. Lui, Hong Kong computer scientist

Other or unknown 
 Frank Lui (1935–2021), Niuean politician
 Joseph Lui (died 1941), Australian Anglican priest
 Elizabeth Gill Lui (born 1951), American photographer
 Mary Ting Yi Lui (born 1967), American history professor
 Diana Lui (born 1968), Malaysian-born Franco-Belgian artist
 Richard Lui (born ), American television journalist of Chinese descent
 Marco Lui (born 1975), Italian mime and comic
 Cynthia Lui (born 1977), Australian politician of Torres Straits Islander descent
 Lolo Lui (born 1982), Samoan rugby union player
 Anton Lui (born 1985), Papua New Guinean sprinter
 Gustavia Lui (born ), New Zealand businesswoman of Samoan and Tuvaluan descent
 Dunamis Lui (born 1990), Australian rugby league footballer
 Robert Lui (born 1990), Australian rugby league footballer of Torres Straits Islander descent
 Nakkiah Lui (born 1991), Australian writer of Gamilaroi and Torres Strait Islander descent
 Joseph Andy Lui (born 1994), Tongan sprinter
 Lauititi Lui (born 1995), Samoan weightlifter
 Getano Lui (Jnr), indigenous Australian community leader
 Jane Lui, Hong Kong-born American singer songwriter
 Salesio Lui, Tokelauan politician
 Tunoa Lui, American Samoan association football coach
 Wonci Lui, American actress of Chinese descent

See also 
 Lui Paewai (1906–1970), New Zealand rugby union player.
 Lui Passaglia (born 1954), Canadian football player
 Lui Temelkovski (born 1954), Canadian politician
 Chan Fai Lui (born 1955), Hong Kong cyclist (surname Chan, given name Fai Lui)
 Lui Morais (born 1961), Brazilian writer
 Lui Muavesi (born 1966), Fijian middle-distance runner
 Chan Tan Lui (born 1969), Hong Kong table tennis player (surname Chan, given name Tan Lui)
 Lui Shtini (born 1978), Albanian artist
 Lui Watanabe (born 1983), Japanese beauty pageant titleholder
 Lui Giuliani, Australian businessman
 Pour Lui, stage name of a Japanese singer

References 

Chinese-language surnames
Multiple Chinese surnames